Agua Bella is a female technocumbia music group from Peru.

History 
Agua Bella was created in 1999 by music entrepreneur José Castillo, with the idea to merge the technocumbia music with top female voices and beauty. After castings to hire singers and dancers, the original band was composed by singers Evelyn Campos and Yolanda Medina with some non-regular dancers. Their first CD, Cariño Loco, was a success. Since then, Castillo has worked to keep the band between five and six members between singers and dancers.

In 2004, after ten CDs and hundreds of live plays and television appearances, it was announced that Agua Bella was to begin a "new generation". Most of the original members went on an international farewell tour, while the new generation performed their debut tour in Peru.

Discography 
An incomplete list of albums, with singles also listed.

Cariño Loco ("Lucerito Mío", "Cariño Loco", "Merezco un Nuevo Amor")
Agua Bella: ¡Sólo hay una! ("Pasito Tun Tun", "Agua de veneno", "Luna Bonita")
Mil Años (double CD) ("Voy a Buscarme un Amor", "Porqué, Porqué", "El Silbido")
Mejor que Nunca ("El Zapateadito", "Sólo un Papel", "Te Dejo Libre")
Sólo Compárame ("Que No, Que No", "Me Abandonaste", "Salud por Él", "Sólo Compárame")
Mi Orgullo Puede Más ("Que Tienen tus Ojos", "Mi Orgullo Puede Más")
Imparables ("Llévate mi Corazón", "Nadie Muere de Amor", "Que te vaya bien", "Dime por que Te Vas")
El Gran Fiestón ("Así Te Quería Ver")

Members 
List of past and present members of Agua Bella, with present members in bold.

Singers 
Katty Jara
Angie Salcedo
Alejandra Pascucci
Alhely Cheng
Cielo Torres
Evelyn Campos
Giuliana Rengifo
Marina Yafac
Maricarmen Marín
Romy Simeón
Rosa Salazar
Yolanda Medina

Dancers 
Olga Lastra
Kerly Masko
Sally Portocarrero
Cintya Macedo
Fiorella Alburqueque
Kelly Tito
Nancy Castelo Branco V.
Gladys Salas

External links 

Peruvian musical groups
Latin American girl groups
Peruvian women singers
Cumbia musical groups
Musical groups established in 1999
1999 establishments in Peru
Women in Latin music